Cantonese Braille (Chinese: 粵語點字) is a braille script used to write Cantonese in Hong Kong and Macau. It is locally referred to as tim chi (點字, dim2zi6) 'dot characters' or more commonly but ambiguously tuk chi (凸字, dat6zi6) 'raised characters'. Although Cantonese is written in Chinese characters, Cantonese Braille is purely phonetic, with punctuation, digits and Latin letters from the original Braille. It can be mixed with English text.

Charts
Each syllable is divided into three parts: the initial consonant, the rime (vowel and any final consonant), and the tone. For example, 盤, pun4 is written , with initial p, final un and tone 4. (See Cantonese phonology.) Among initials, aspirated consonants (p t ts k kw = p' t' ts' k' kw''') are derived by adding dots to the unaspirated consonants (b d dz g gw = p t ts k kw):M and ng may also be used as rimes (syllabic nasals), in which case they are followed directly by the tone.
When i or u (but not y) begins a syllable, a dummy consonant j or w is prefixed.

† represents the symbol was abolished in the revised version in 1990.

The rimes eu, em, ep'' do not exist in braille.

High tone (tones 1 and 7) is not transcribed. Otherwise tone is written after the rime, as follows:

In numerical order, the cells are as follows:

Punctuation 
Some of the punctuation marks are distinguished from the onset or rime of a syllable by the strategic use of the  space.  The spaces are therefore included in the table below, though they are not technically part of the punctuation mark. 

The emphasis marks,  are equivalent to running dots alongside the characters in print, while proper names are marked in print by an underline or overline.

See also
Cantonese
Chinese Braille

References

 UNESCO (2013) World Braille Usage , 3rd edition.

Cantonese language
Languages of Hong Kong
French-ordered braille scripts